A parakeet is any one of many small to medium-sized species of parrot, in multiple genera, that generally has long tail feathers.

Etymology and naming 
The name parakeet is derived from the French word perroquet, which is reflected in some older spellings that are still sometimes encountered, including paroquet or paraquet. However, in modern French, perruche is used to refer to parakeets and similar-sized parrots.

In American English, the word parakeet usually refers to the budgerigar, which is one species of parakeet.

Summary 

Parakeets comprise about 115 species of birds that are seed-eating parrots of small size, slender build, and long, tapering tails. The Australian budgerigar, also known as "budgie", Melopsittacus undulatus, is probably the most common parakeet. It was first described by zoologists in 1891. It is the most popular species of parakeet kept as a pet in North America and Europe. 

The term "grass parakeet" (or grasskeet) refers to many small Australian parakeets native to grasslands such as the genus Neophema and the princess parrot. The Australian rosellas are also parakeets. Many of the smaller, long-tailed species of lories may be referred to as "lorikeets". The vernacular name ring-necked parakeet (not to be confused with the Australian ringneck) refers to a species of the genus Psittacula native to Africa and Asia that is popular as a pet and has become feral in many cities outside its natural range.

In aviculture, the term "conure" is used for small to medium-sized parakeets of the genera Aratinga, Pyrrhura, and a few other genera of the tribe Arini, which are mainly endemic to South America.  As they are not all from one genus, taxonomists tend to avoid the term.  Other South American species commonly called parakeets include the genus Brotogeris parakeets, the monk parakeet, and lineolated parakeets, although lineolateds have short tails.

A larger species may be referred to as "parrot" or "parakeet" interchangeably.  For example, "Alexandrine parrot" and "Alexandrine parakeet" are two common names for the same species, Psittacula eupatria, which is one of the largest species normally referred to as a parakeet.

Many different species of parakeets are bred and sold commercially as pets, the budgerigar being the third most popular pet in the world, after cats and dogs. Budgerigars are great companions for any age and can be easily trained.

Breeding 
Parakeets often breed more readily in groups; however, there can be conflicts between breeding pairs and individuals especially if space is limited. The presence of other parakeets encourages a pair to breed, which is why breeding in a group is better. Despite this, many breeders choose to breed in pairs to both avoid conflicts and know offspring's parentage with certainty. Parakeets lay an average of 4-8 eggs, while budgerigars (a species of parakeet) lay an average of 4-6 eggs.

United Kingdom population 

In December 2019 Steven Le Comber, of Queen Mary University in London, United Kingdom, published an analysis in the Journal of Zoology based on geographic profiling methods. It concluded that the thriving rose-ringed parakeet population in the United Kingdom had grown from numerous small-scale accidental and intentional pet releases. Previous theories had included a pair released by Jimi Hendrix on Carnaby Street and an arrival in 1951 when Humphrey Bogart and Katharine Hepburn visited London with various animals to film The African Queen, set in the equatorial swamps of east Africa.

Spain parakeet control measures 
According to a 2018 report, Spanish authorities have drawn up plans to curb the ever-growing population of parakeets which has reached 30,000 in locations such as Malaga.

See also
 Cockatiel
 Budgerigar
 Conure
 Mini-macaw

References  

 
Bird common names